Booth is an extinct town in Pike County, in the U.S. state of Missouri.

A post office called Booth was established in 1884, and remained in operation until 1895. The community has the name of Thomas Booth, a local medical doctor.
Inhabited: 1884–1895, Highest pop: 312 (1894).
Booth became uninhabited because the entire town found better jobs in different town nearby than Booth Factory which employed 80% of the adults which lived in Booth.

References

Ghost towns in Missouri
Former populated places in Pike County, Missouri